Toros Neftekamsk is an ice hockey team in Neftekamsk, Russia. They play in the Supreme Hockey League (VHL), the second level of Russian ice hockey. The Russian word "toros" means "hummock, ice block".

History
The club was founded in 1988 (and prior to 1990 was named Torpedo Neftekamsk). They joined the VHL since its inaugural 2010–11 season and became affiliated with Salavat Yulaev Ufa of the Kontinental Hockey League (KHL). Toros twice won VHL championship – in 2012 and 2013 (defeating in the finals Rubin and Saryarka respectively). As the VHL champions they twice participated in the IIHF Continental Cup.

The team also was runner-up of the "old" Vysshaya Liga in 2010 (fell to HC Yugra).

References

External links
Official site

Ice hockey teams in Russia
Ice hockey clubs established in 1988
Sport in Bashkortostan